Alberto Carrara (born 1958), best known as Carrara and King Carrara, is an Italian singer, composer, arranger, music producer, and disc jockey. He sold over three million records. In the 1990s he started an activity of music producer with the label "Disco Magic".

Career
Born in Bergamo, Carrara started his career as disc jockey at 15. A self-taught musician, in 1983 he obtained his first success, "Disco King". One year later, he got his main success, "Shine on dance", which won the 1984 Festivalbar.

Discography

Singles

References

Further reading 
 Alberto Gedda, "Oh mio caro ex deejay!", La Stampa, 12 September 1984

External links 
 Carrara at Discogs

Italian male singers
Living people
Musicians from Bergamo
Italian Italo disco musicians
English-language singers from Italy
1958 births